The 1920 Vernon Tigers season was the 12th season in the history of the Vernon Tigers baseball team. Playing in the Pacific Coast League (PCL), the team compiled a 110–88 record and won the PCL pennant. Vernon compiled the best record in the PCL for a third consecutive seasons under manager Bill Essick. 

The Tigers' championship was marred by revelations during the 1920 season of a gambling scandal involving first baseman Babe Borton. Borton admitted paying money during the 1919 pennant race to three players on the Salt Lake City Bees to throw games against the Tigers. Borton claimed that bribes had also been paid by a teammate to Portland and Seattle players, that the bribes were paid out of a pool of money funded by numerous teammates, and that the bribes were instigated by Vernor manager Bill Essick. Borton was released by the Tigers in August 1920 and never again played professional baseball. Borton was charged by a Los Angeles grand jury in December 1920 with criminal conspiracy for his role in the bribery scandal.

1920 PCL standings

Statistics

Batting 
Note: Pos = Position; G = Games played; AB = At bats; H = Hits; Avg. = Batting average; HR = Home runs; SLG = Slugging percentage

Pitching 
Note: G = Games pitched; IP = Innings pitched; W = Wins; L = Losses; PCT = Win percentage; ERA = Earned run average; SO = Strikeouts

References

Further reading
 "The Greatest Minor League: A History of the Pacific Coast League, 1903-1957", by Dennis Snelling (McFarland 2011

1920 in sports in California
Pacific Coast League seasons